Solanecio is a genus of African plants in the groundsel tribe within the sunflower family.

The name "Solanecio" is a combination of the names "Solanum" and "Senecio," referring to the purported resemblance the species have to both of these established genera. Resemblance to Solanum is, of course, superficial.

 Species

References

Senecioneae
Asteraceae genera
Flora of Africa